Champ is the short form of champion.

Champ, CHAMP or The Champ may also refer to:

Arts and media

Fictional characters
 Champ (cartoon character), an animated dog introduced in 1960
 The Champ, played on radio and created by Jake Edwards
 Champ the Dog, from the Postal video game series
 Champ, the mascot of Louisiana Tech University
 Champion "Champ" Kind, from Anchorman: The Legend of Ron Burgundy

Film and television
 The Champ (1931 film), a 1931 film directed by King Vidor
 The Champ (1979 film), a remake of the 1931 film
 Champ (2011 film), a 2011 South Korean film
 Champ, a South Korea cable channel, originally a joint venture of Daewon Media and CJ Media

Music

Albums
 The Champ (Jimmy Smith album), 1956
 The Champ (Sonny Stitt album), 1974
 Champ (album), 2010, by Tokyo Police Club

Songs
 "The Champ", a 1951 composition by jazz trumpeter Dizzy Gillespie
"The Champ" (The Mohawks song), 1968
"The Champ", a song by Ghostface Killah on the 2006 album Fishscale
"The Champ" (Nelly song), 2011

People
 Champ (nickname)
 Champ (surname)
 Champ Butler (1926–1992), American singer
 Champ Lyons (born 1940), justice of the Supreme Court of Alabama
 Champ Seibold (1911–1971), American football player

Places
 Champ, Missouri, United States, a village
 Champ, Audrain County, Missouri
 Champ Island, a European Russian arctic island

Science
 CHAMP (satellite), launched in 2000
 John George Champion, botanical abbreviation Champ.
 Counter-electronics High Power Microwave Advanced Missile Project, a directed energy weapon demonstrator

Vehicles
 Austin Champ, a 1950s military and civilian jeep-like vehicle
 Plymouth Champ, a rebadged variant of the Dodge Colt subcompact car
 Studebaker Champ, a pickup truck produced from 1960 to 1964
 Aeronca Champion, a light aircraft

Other uses
 Champ (dog), Joe Biden's family pet
 Champ (folklore), a monster supposedly living in Lake Champlain
 Champ (food), an Irish dish of mashed potatoes and scallions
 CHAMP (mathematics outreach program), in the Houston, Texas area
 Fender Champ, a guitar amplifier
 Samsung Champ, a phone
 Four square, a game, sometimes called Champ
 Champ, a type of burger at Jollibee restaurants

See also
 
 
 Champs (disambiguation)
 Chaamp, a 2017 Bengali film